Piers Damian G. Faccini (born 1970) is an English singer, painter and songwriter.

Biography
Piers Faccini was born in London, England to an Italian father and an English mother. His family moved to France when he was five years old. His brother is the writer Ben Faccini.

Faccini first appeared on the music scene in London in 1997, co-founding Charley Marlowe with performance poet Francesca Beard, percussionist Frank Byng and guitarist Luc Suarez; the band split in 2001 when Faccini decided to pursue a solo career. His first solo album Leave no Trace was released in 2004 by French Independent label Label Bleu. His second album was released by Los Angeles label Everloving Records in 2006; Tearing Sky was produced by JP Plunier, and featured Ben Harper, who Faccini would tour with between 2006 and 2008. His third album released by the French independent record label Tot ou Tard in 2009 was co-produced by Faccini and Renaud Letang. His fourth album, My Wilderness, was released in late 2011 on Six Degrees Records. His fifth album, Between Dogs and Wolves (2013) and sixth album, I Dreamed an Island (2016) were released on his own label Beating Drum.

Faccini has collaborated over the years with many musicians and singers including Rokia Traore, Busi Mhlongo, Ben Harper, Ballake Sissoko, Vincent Segal, Camille, Francesca Beard, Luc Suarez, Seb Martel, Patrick Watson, Dawn Landes and Ibrahim Maalouf amongst others. In March 2011, Faccini contributed to the Patagonia Music Collective, contributing to the UK-based Environmental Justice Foundation.

Faccini has also produced several albums for other artists, most notably Ela by Brazilian cellist and singer Dom La Nena, Northern Folk by Jenny Lysander and Terre de Mon Poeme by Yelli Yelli. Faccini is also a poet and children's author, publishing his first book of poetry No One's Here in 2016 and a children's book/cd La Plus Belle des Berceuses which he also illustrated in 2017, published by the French publisher, Actes Sud.

In 2009, his album, Two Grains Of Sand, was nominated for the French independent music award, Le Prix Constantin and voted album of the year by the listeners of French national radio, France Inter. His album with the cellist Vincent Segal Songs of Time Lost was in NPR's top ten world music albums of 2014 and in Songlines top 10 albums of 2014 as well as in their Greatest World Music Albums of the last five years.

His seventh studio album Shapes Of The Fall was released 2 April 2021. The 13 tracks were co-produced by Piers Faccini and Fred Soulard.

Discography

References

External links
Official Website
MySpace
Piers Faccini at Last.FM
Piers Faccini's EPK, music video and take-away shows
Piers Faccini's Patagonia Benefit Track for the Environmental Justice Foundation

1970 births
Living people
English male singer-songwriters
People educated at Eton College
Label Bleu artists
English male painters
21st-century English painters
21st-century English singers
Six Degrees Records artists
21st-century British male singers
21st-century English male artists